Jessie Menifield Rattley (May 4, 1929 – March 2, 2001) served as the mayor of Newport News, Virginia from 1986 to 1990, the first woman and first African-American to hold the mayorship.

Life and career
Jessie M. Rattley was born to the late Alonzo and Altona Menifield, on May 4, 1929, in Birmingham, Alabama.  She attended schools in and graduated from Fairfield High School in 1947, after which she entered Hampton Institute in Hampton, Virginia, graduating with honors in 1951. That same year Mrs. Rattley began her teaching career at Huntington High School in Newport News, Virginia, where she established the business department.

On June 9, 1952, Mrs. Rattley founded the Peninsula Business College, which provided an opportunity for youth and adults to be trained for careers in business. In seeking employment opportunities for her students, she began her lifelong commitment to civil rights and political involvement.

Rattley obtained a degree from distance learning school La Salle Extension University.

She was the first African-American to be elected to the Newport News City Council in 1970. Her election was seen as a major turning point in the civil rights movement for residents in Newport News.  Her presence on the City Council led to residents of the city's Southeast community (most of them African-American) seeing funding for their schools and city services increased. She was elected vice-mayor in 1976 and mayor in 1986, the first woman and first African-American to hold each of those offices. During her tenure as mayor, she received some criticism from residents due to her controversial plan to expand HUD and federally subsidized low-income housing into what was the more recently upscale sections of the city, such as Denbigh.

On August 9, 2005, the Newport News City Hall and the government buildings immediately surrounding it were rededicated the Jessie Menifield Rattley Municipal Center in her honor.

References

1929 births
2001 deaths
Mayors of Newport News, Virginia
African-American women in politics
African-American mayors in Virginia
Women mayors of places in Virginia
Virginia Democrats
La Salle Extension University alumni
20th-century American politicians
20th-century American women politicians
Virginia city council members
Women city councillors in Virginia
Politicians from Birmingham, Alabama
Hampton University alumni
20th-century American educators
Educators from Alabama
Educators from Virginia
20th-century American women educators
African-American city council members
20th-century African-American women
20th-century African-American politicians